27th New York Film Critics Circle Awards
January 20, 1962(announced December 28, 1961)

West Side Story
The 27th New York Film Critics Circle Awards, honored the best filmmaking of 1961.

Winners
Best Film:
West Side Story
Best Actor:
Maximilian Schell - Judgment at Nuremberg
Best Actress:
Sophia Loren - Two Women (La ciociara)
Best Director:
Robert Rossen - The Hustler
Best Screenplay:
Abby Mann - Judgment at Nuremberg
Best Foreign Language Film:
La Dolce Vita • Italy/France

References

External links
1961 Awards

1961
New York Film Critics Circle Awards, 1961
New York Film Critics Circle Awards
New York Film Critics Circle Awards
New York Film Critics Circle Awards
New York Film Critics Circle Awards